Edwin Marvin Rick (January 31, 1901 – January 21, 1999) was an American middle-distance runner. He was educated at Erasmus Hall High School before attending Mercersburg Academy, where he trained under Scots American coach Jimmy Curran. He entered university at both Princeton and Massachusetts Institute of Technology. He went on to compete in the men's 3000 metres steeplechase at the 1924 Summer Olympics.

References

External links
 

1901 births
1999 deaths
Athletes (track and field) at the 1924 Summer Olympics
American male middle-distance runners
American male steeplechase runners
Olympic track and field athletes of the United States
Sportspeople from Brooklyn
Track and field athletes from New York City